Barbaralee Diamonstein-Spielvogel (born January 27, 1932) is an American preservationist, historian, author, and television producer. She is an advocate for the preservation of the historic built environment and the arts. She has worked in the fields of art, architecture, crafts, historic preservation, fashion, and public policy in the U.S. She is the author of 24 books, numerous articles and essays, and recipient of many honors and awards. She is a former White House Assistant, the first Director of Cultural Affairs in New York City, and the longest serving New York City Landmarks Preservation Commissioner.

Career 
From 1963 to 1966, she served as a White House Assistant at The White House, where she helped create the White House Fellows, the Presidential Scholars Program, and the first and only White House Festival of the Arts in 1965. In 1966, she was appointed by Mayor John V. Lindsay as the first Director of Cultural Affairs in New York City. As director, she organized the first public art exhibition, which was in Bryant Park with artist Tony Smith, the first public performance in Central Park by the Metropolitan Opera, and the first week-long festival of films about New York at the Regency Theatre.

In 1972, Mayor  Lindsay appointed Diamonstein-Spielvogel to be a Commissioner of the NYC Landmarks Preservation Commission. She served until 1987, the longest serving Commissioner for this agency. She also served, for more than a decade, on the NYC Advisory Commission for Cultural Affairs (1975 to 1986); now the Cultural Affairs Advisory Commission. In this role, she was Chair/Founder of the Mayor's Awards of Arts and Culture. From 1987 to 1995, she was named Chair of the NYC Landmarks Preservation Foundation, where she created and funded the placement of Historic District street signs, descriptive markers, and maps in each of New York City's then-84 Historic Districts, which have since become models for similar initiatives throughout the United States. The historic markers and street name signs were designed pro bono by renowned designer Massimo Vignelli and colored terra cotta, black and white, to blend well with many building materials. Diamonstein-Spielvogel entered into an agreement with the city, for the NYC Department of Transportation to maintain the signs and finance additional signs. In 1995, she became Chair of Historic Landmarks Preservation Center (HLPC), where she created a Cultural Medallion program which documents notable occurrences, distinguished individuals and other important aspects of New York City’s cultural, economic, political and social history. The medallions were also designed pro bono by Massimo Vignelli.

In 1987, she was appointed by President Ronald Reagan to the Board of the United States Holocaust Memorial Museum, where she served as Chair of the subcommittee that commissioned all of the original art created for the museum. She was appointed by Mayor David Dinkins to the Art Commission of the City of New York (now the Public Design Commission), and served from 1991 to 1994. In 1992, she was appointed to the United States Commission of Fine Arts by President Bill Clinton, and was the first woman Vice Chair of the Commission of Fine Arts, where she served until 2003.

President Barack Obama appointed her a Commissioner of the American Battle Monuments Commission, which has responsibilities related to the design, construction, and maintenance of military memorials throughout the world. In 2010, Diamonstein-Spielvogel was appointed a director of the Trust for the National Mall in Washington D.C. In July 2013, she was named to lead the American Battle Monuments Commission delegation in Busan, Korea and was the keynote speaker at the ceremony commemorating the 60th anniversary of the armistice of the Korean War, attended by leaders and veterans of 21 participant nations.

In 2012, she was named the Chair of NYC Landmarks50 Alliance, a voluntary group of over 150 member organizations, collaborating to commemorate the 50th anniversary (April 19, 2015) of the NYC landmarks law. The Alliance's ongoing goal is to create a community of purpose, and to facilitate dialogue among all New Yorkers who care about the historic built environment. The organization, now known as NYC Landmarks50+ Alliance, plans to commemorate the 55th Anniversary of the NYC landmarks law.

In May 2015, she was appointed to the Advisory Board of the Gracie Mansion Conservancy by Mayor Bill de Blasio.  In June 2015, she was named to the Advisory Committee of the National Eisenhower Memorial; the Memorial is designed by architect Frank Gehry, and adjacent to the National Mall in Washington, D.C.

In 2016, Diamonstein-Spielvogel was appointed chairwoman of the New York State Council on the Arts. She was appointed to NYSCA in 2007, and served as the council’s vice chair from 2013-2016. She served as NYSCA Chair until 2018.

Honors and awards
Diamonstein-Spielvogel has been the recipient of many honors and awards. In 1994, Diamonstein-Spielvogel was the first woman to be honored with the Pratt Institute Founder's Award, and in 1995 was awarded the annual Visionary in the Arts' Award from the Museum of Contemporary Crafts/The Museum of Arts and Design in New York. In 1998, she was the recipient of the Ralph Menapace Award of the Friends of the Upper East Side Historic District. She also received the first Miami Beach Art Deco Preservation Award; was the first woman to be elected, in 2001, as an honorary member of PEN-Slovakia; and in 2003, received the Gen. Milan R. Stefanik Award for contributing to the advancement of public knowledge about the Slovak nation and people. In 2004, The Slovak Republic's Ministry of Foreign Affairs decorated her for “her remarkable personal contribution to the development of a civil society in Slovakia.” In 2005, she was named an Honorary Member of the American Institute of Architects, and was awarded the Humanitarian Award of the Jewish Women's Foundation in New York. In 2008, she received the Lifetime Achievement Award from Partners for Livable Places in Washington, D.C. In 2008, together with Murakami and Julian Schnabel, she was named a “Legend” by Pratt Institute.

In 2010, she received a lifetime achievement award by the Citizens Committee of New York. In October 2010, Duke University initiated the Diamonstein-Spielvogel Visiting Filmmaker Series to address significant contemporary topics of social, political, economic, and cultural urgency from a global perspective. And in 2015, she initiated the Diamonstein-Spielvogel Artist in Residence Program at Duke University, to provide an annual on-campus residency; in November 2016, she initiated a three-year pilot of the Sanford Innovator-in-Residence Program, also at Duke University.  In addition to her earned doctorate from NYU, she is the recipient of four honorary doctorates from: the Maryland Institute College of Art in Baltimore, Maryland; Longwood University in Farmville, Virginia; Pratt Institute, in New York City, and SUNY-Purchase (2017). Diamonstein-Spielvogel received the Historic Districts Council's Landmarks Lion award in 2011 and the John Jay Medal for Service for lifetime contribution to the arts, architecture, and public policy from the Jay Heritage Center in 2012.

In November 2015, Dr. Diamonstein-Spielvogel was honored by the Historic Districts Council as one of the Pride of Landmark Lions recognized as part of the 50th Anniversary celebration of the New York City landmarks law. And in December 2015, she received the St. Nicholas Society Medal of Merit, and was also honored that same month by the New York Preservation Archive Project as the recipient of their inaugural Preservation Award. She served as Co-Chair of the King and Country Gala Benefit for the Brooklyn Academy of Music on April 3, 2016; on April 28, 2016, she received the NY Landmark Conservancy’s Lucy G. Moses Preservation Leadership Award, given to outstanding individuals in the field of historic preservation. On September 14, 2016, she received the Annual Preservation Award from the American Friends of the Georgian Group, and on November 19, 2016, was honored at the ArtsWestchester Gala “Celebrating Women.” She and her husband were honored by The Acting Company with The Joan Warburg Humanitarian Award on November 12, 2018, and by the Clarion Society, on March 5, 2019, for their leadership in the arts. On October 22, 2019, she will receive the Ellen Stewart Centennial Medal, together with Philip Glass, given by the LaMama Theatre.

She is married to the leading international business executive, and former U.S. Ambassador to The Slovak Republic, Carl Spielvogel.

Publications 
Diamonstein-Spielvogel served as an interviewer/producer for seven television series about the arts, architecture, design, crafts, and public policy for the Arts & Entertainment Network, and other programs for national networks including CBS and NBC. Nearly two hundred of her television interviews are now available on iTunes U and YouTube, digitized by the Diamonstein-Spielvogel Video Archive at Duke University. Diamonstein-Spielvogel has also been a contributing author to publications including The New York Times, Vogue, Ladies Home Journal, Harper's Bazaar, the Partisan Review, Art News, and many others.

She has shared her combined experience and scholarship on art, architecture, photography, crafts, interior design, fashion, and public policy through the authorship of  twenty-four books and numerous articles and essays. This included her work as a fellow of the Architectural League, Collaborations: Artists and Architects, subsequently the subject of  an important museum exhibit, which resuscitated this significant and long moribund relationship.  This also included Open Secrets (1972), Inside New York's Art World: Conversations with Barbaralee Diamonstein (1979), a book of  interviews with distinguished artists, museum directors, curators, collectors and dealers. Buildings Reborn, Interior Design (1982); Handmade in America (1983), American Architecture Now (1985); Fashion: The Inside Story (1988); Landmarks: Eighteen Wonders of the New York World (1992); Inside the Art World (1994); Singular Voices (1997). Her most recent book, Notable New Yorkers: The HLPC Cultural Medallions Program, was published in 2018.   She is also the author of  dozens of  magazine and newspaper articles, which have appeared in The New York Times, Vogue, Harper's Bazaar, Ladies' Home Journal, and many other publications.

The Landmarks of New York
Her book The Landmarks of New York, now in its Sixth Edition, contains detailed descriptions and photographs of individual, interior, and scenic landmarks and the historic districts and extensions that have been accorded landmark status by the New York City Landmarks Preservation Commission. Diamonstein-Spielvogel is the curator of several international traveling exhibition, including one based on "The Landmarks of New York," which was circulated to 82 countries on 5 continents, in an unprecedented tour sponsored by the U.S. Department of  State, traveled to sixteen venues in New York State, and is now traveling within New York City.

References

American architectural historians
Living people
American women historians
Historians from New York (state)
20th-century American historians
21st-century American historians
21st-century American women writers
20th-century American women writers
1932 births